Lethyna gladiatrix is a species of tephritid or fruit flies in the genus Lethyna of the family Tephritidae.

Distribution
Uganda, Zimbabwe, Namibia, South Africa, Lesotho.

References

Tephritinae
Taxa named by Mario Bezzi
Insects described in 1920
Diptera of Africa